Jean Milo was the  pseudonym of Belgian author and artist Émile Van Gindertael. He was born in  Saint-Josse-ten-Noode during 1906 and died in 1993 at Rixensart. He was also a painter, poet, essayist and novelist.

Biography 
From 1926 to 1931, Jean Milo was the director of the Belgian Gallery Le Centaure. As a painter, he was influential over Edgard Tytgat who wrote a biography about him. He helped found the Art abstrait  group in 1952. Then, in 1980, he created a series of photo-collages which are now held by the Verbeke Foundation in Belgium.

Works 
 1938 : L'Étang de Malbourg
 1944 : L'Esprit de famille, Prix des Deux Magots
 1956 : Le Marteau

Major Exhibitions 
 1986: A Retrospective exhibit in the Royal Museums of Fine Arts of Belgium

References 
 L. Haesaerts, Jean Milo, Anvers : De Sikkel, 1954 (Collection : Monographies de l'art belge).
 Jean Milo, exposition rétrospective, éditions des Musées royaux des beaux-arts de Belgique, 1986.

1993 deaths
Prix des Deux Magots winners
1906 births
People from Saint-Josse-ten-Noode
20th-century Belgian painters